Boðberi (English title: Messenger) is a 2010 Icelandic dramatic film directed by Hjálmar Einarsson and starring Darri Ingolfsson. The film was released on July 7, 2010.

Plot synopsis
Paul, part-time laborer and amateur artist, leads an unremarkable life like any other, until his world is disrupted by vivid revelations of the afterlife.

At first a welcome respite from reality, his waking visions soon reveal a demonic conspiracy at work within his own community. One by one, prominent members of high society fall victim to a series of mysterious assassination attempts. As the government scrambles to contain the rising panic of the ruling class, public disillusionment grows. Amidst the maelstrom, Paul becomes entangled in a web of powerful elite, evangelical cults, and a plot that could not only bring down the country's economy, but also incite the total collapse of society.

Production
The film was mostly shot before the 2008 Icelandic financial crash that shocked the world, and it inadvertently became a prediction of the chaos that followed. 

Boðberi is notable for being made without any public funding which is unusual for a theatrically distributed film in Iceland.

Visual effects
Boðberi had numerous visual effects shot, most notably the explosion of the House of Parliament (Alþingi) in Reykjavík.

Marketing
Before its premiere, Boðberi was marketed both online and on local TV stations. A theatrical trailer was premiered in May 2010.

Release
Boðberi was released nationwide to cinemas on July 7, 2010. November 2010 saw its DVD release, and it was released on video-on-demand the following month. Boðberi premiered on RÚV, the Icelandic National TV, in 2019 and was made available for streaming for limited time. It re-ran on RÚV in 2021.

Reception
Boðberi was met with polarized reviews; some praised the effort the filmmakers undertook while others were less enthusiastic, criticizing the incoherent plot and alleged mixed performances. It remains one of Iceland's most controversial movies to date.

References

External links
 
 

2010 films
Icelandic thriller films
2010 thriller films
2010s Icelandic-language films